Jesús Rodríguez (born 15 November 1933) is a Spanish weightlifter. He competed in the men's light heavyweight event at the 1960 Summer Olympics.

References

1933 births
Living people
Spanish male weightlifters
Olympic weightlifters of Spain
Weightlifters at the 1960 Summer Olympics
Sportspeople from Bilbao
20th-century Spanish people